Lawrence Melvin Bunce (born July 29, 1945, in Tacoma, Washington) is an American former professional basketball player.
He was drafted in 1967 by the Seattle SuperSonics in the fourth round of that year's NBA draft, but opted to start and end his professional career in the ABA.

A 7'0" center from Utah State University, Bunce played two seasons (1967–1969) in the American Basketball Association as a member of the Anaheim Amigos, Denver Rockets, Dallas Chaparrals, and Houston Mavericks.  He averaged 8.9 points and 6.4 rebounds in his career and appeared in the 1968 ABA All-Star Game. He was also the tallest player in the ABA during its first season of operation.

In 1970, Bunce was arrested and charged with extortion by the Riverside County, California District Attorney. Bunce sent a letter to a Riverside physician demanding  $2,000 or else he would harm their family. Following Bence's arrest, a bank employee at the Security Pacific National Bank in Riverside reported to the Federal Bureau of Investigation that they had received a similar letter from Bunce demanding $1,000. Bunce pleaded guilty to the extortion charges and was fined $625 and sentenced to five years probation.

Bunce made a return to professional basketball in 1975 when he signed with Alviks BK in Stockholm, Sweden.

Notes

1945 births
Living people
American expatriate basketball people in the Philippines
American men's basketball players
Anaheim Amigos players
Basketball players from Tacoma, Washington
Centers (basketball)
Dallas Chaparrals players
Denver Rockets players
Houston Mavericks players
Riverside City Tigers men's basketball players
Seattle SuperSonics draft picks
Utah State Aggies men's basketball players
American extortionists
American expatriate basketball people in Sweden